Joseph Pastor Neelankavil (19 March 1930 – 17 February 2021) was a bishop of the Syro-Malabar Church.

Neelankavil was born in Aranattukara, Kerala, India and was ordained to the priesthood in 1960. He served as bishop of the Syro-Malabar Catholic Eparchy of Sagar, India, from 1987 to 2006.

Neelankavil died from COVID-19 on 17 February 2021.

Notes

1930 births
2021 deaths
Syro-Malabar bishops
20th-century Roman Catholic bishops in India
21st-century Roman Catholic bishops in India
Christian clergy from Thrissur
Place of death missing
Deaths from the COVID-19 pandemic in India